Stade is a city in Germany.

Stade may also refer to:

Places
Stade (district), a district in Germany
Stade (region), a region in Germany
Stad (peninsula), a peninsula in Norway
The Stade, a beach in Hastings Old Town, Hastings, East Sussex, England

People
Albert of Stade, 13th-century chronicler
Bernhard Stade (1848—1906), German Protestant theologian and historian
Frederica von Stade (born 1945) American mezzo-soprano
George Stade (1933 - 2019) American literary scholar, critic and novelist

Other uses
Stade or stadion, unit of length

See also

Stadion (running race) or stade, an ancient footrace
Stadium
Stadium (disambiguation)